The Man Is Armed is a 1956 film noir crime film directed by Franklin Adreon starring Dane Clark, William Talman, May Wynn and Robert Horton.

Plot

Framed by another man, truck driver Johnny Morrison serves a year in prison. After his release, Johnny confronts the man, Mitch Mitchell, who plunges off a roof to his death.

Johnny then learns that his former employer, Hackett, was the one who set him up as a fall guy. Hackett claims it was a test of loyalty, and since Johnny passed, he now stands to earn $100,000 for helping Hackett pull off the robbery of an armored transport company.

Johnny's old girlfriend, Carol Wayne, still has feelings for him, even though she has been seeing Mike Benning, a young doctor. While the death of Mitchell is investigated by police Lt. Coster as a homicide, Johnny and three other thugs pull off the heist.

Unable to get the loot to Hackett due to roadblocks, Johnny hides out. Hackett, believing he has been double-crossed, shoots Johnny and buries the money on his family farm, but the police catch up to him. A wounded Johnny knocks out Mike and abducts Carol, but collapses and dies after a few steps. Mike leads Carol away as the cops arrive.

Cast
 Dane Clark as Johnny Morrison
 William Talman as Hackett
 May Wynn as Carol Wayne
 Robert Horton as Dr. Michael Benning
 Barton MacLane as Det. Lt. Dan Coster
 Fredd Wayne as Egan
 Richard Benedict as Lew 'Mitch' Mitchell
 Richard Reeves as Rutberg
 Harry Lewis as Cole
 Bobby Jordan as Thorne
 Larry J. Blake as Ray Perkins
 Darlene Fields as Terrycloth
 John Mitchum as Officer

See also
List of American films of 1956

References

External links
 
 
 

1956 films
1956 crime films
American crime films
American black-and-white films
Film noir
Republic Pictures films
1950s English-language films
Films directed by Franklin Adreon
1950s American films